Euthynteria is the ancient Greek term for the uppermost course of a building's foundations, partly emerging from groundline. The superstructure of the building (stylobate, columns, walls, and entablature) were set on the euthynteria. Archaeologists and architects use the term in discussion of Classical architecture.

See also
 Crepidoma
 Ancient Greek temple

References

Architectural elements
Ancient Greek architecture